Inner Mongolia University of Science and Technology (IMUST) (内蒙古科技大学) is a university in Inner Mongolia, China under the authority of the Inner Mongolia government and the education department of Chinese Education.

It was formerly well known as Baotou Steel and Iron Institute (包头钢铁学院). It changed to its current name in 2003, when it merged with Baotou Normal College (包头师范学院) and Baotou Medical College (包头医学院); however in 2004 the three institutes resumed separate governing, and the merger remains essentially only as a name now.

Universities and colleges in Inner Mongolia